The azure hawker (Aeshna caerulea) is one of the smaller species of hawker dragonflies, (family Aeshnidae). The flight period is from late May to August

It is about 62 mm long. Both sexes have azure blue spots on each abdominal segment and the thorax also has azure markings. The markings on the male are brighter and more conspicuous than in the female. The female also has a brown colour form.

This species flies in sunshine, and will also bask on stones or tree trunks. It shelters in heather or similar low vegetation in dull weather. Unique to this species is that the blue of the male pales to a more grey colour at lower temperatures.

The species is widespread in the Eurasian polar region. In Great Britain, the azure hawker occurs only in Scotland.

References

External links
British Insects: Odonata

Aeshnidae
Dragonflies of Europe
Insects described in 1783
Taxa named by Hans Strøm